The Johnny Cash Show is the 35th overall album and third live album by American country singer Johnny Cash, recorded at the Grand Ole Opry House and released on Columbia Records in 1970 as a tie-in with Cash's then-current TV series of the same title. Though one of Cash's lesser-known live records, it spawned the highly successful single "Sunday Mornin' Comin' Down", which helped kickstart the career of singer-songwriter Kris Kristofferson. The song and album reached #1 on the Country charts. It was also his final chart entry in Australia, going no higher than #35. The
album was certified Gold on February 16, 1995, by the RIAA.

Track listing
 "Sunday Morning Coming Down" (Kris Kristofferson) – 4:04
 "Come Along and Ride This Train" (Cash) – 6:16
"Six Days on the Road" (Earl Green, Carl Montgomery)
"There Ain't No Easy Run" (Tom T. Hall, Dave Dudley)
"Sailor on a Concrete Sea" (Merle Travis)
 "These Hands" (Eddie Noack) – 3:45
 "I'm Gonna Try to Be That Way" (Cash) – 3:24
 "Come Along and Ride This Train" (Cash) – 8:04
"Mississippi Delta Land" (Harlan Howard)
"Detroit City" (Mel Tillis, Danny Dill)
"Uncloudy Day" (Joshua K. Alwood)
"No Setting Sun" (Ruth Davis)
"Mississippi Delta Land"
 "Here Was a Man" (Johnny Bond, Tex Ritter) – 2:56

Personnel
 Johnny Cash – vocals, acoustic guitar
 The Carter Family – background vocals
 The Statler Brothers – background vocals
 Marshall Grant – bass guitar
 W.S. Holland – drums
 Bob Wootton – electric guitar
 Carl Perkins – electric guitar
 Norman Blake – acoustic guitar
 Bill Walker – orchestra leader

Additional personnel
Produced by Bob Johnston
Arranged and conducted by Bill Walker
"These Hands" Arranged by Barry McDonald
Engineering: Neil Wilburn
Cover Photo: John Burg

Charts
Album – Billboard (United States)

Singles – Billboard (United States)

References

Albums produced by Bob Johnston
1970 live albums
Johnny Cash live albums
Columbia Records live albums